Harsh noise wall, also known as wall noise or HNW, is an extreme subgenre of noise music, described as "a literal consistent, unflinching and enveloping wall of monolithic noise." The movement is spearheaded by French musician Vomir, who described his aesthetic as "no ideas, no change, no development, no entertainment, no remorse". The genre soon gained traction in the United States. Artists such as the Haters, Daniel Menche, and Richard Ramirez are best known for popularizing the noise genre in the US.

Harsh noise wall features noises layered together to form a static sound. Harsh noise wall musician Sam McKinlay, also known as The Rita, considered the genre as "the purification of the Japanese harsh noise scene into a more refined crunch, which crystallizes the tonal qualities of distortion in a slow moving minimalistic texture."

Despite largely staying underground, harsh noise wall has enjoyed a cult following among the noise music scene. A series of events dedicated to the genre, named as Harsh Noise Wall Festival, is organized at Les Instants Chavirés, Montreuil, Seine-Saint-Denis by Vomir, with guests involving prominent musicians such as Werewolf Jerusalem, TheNightProduct, Black Leather Jesus and Tissa Mawartyassari.

See also

 Avant-garde music
 Gorenoise

References

Further reading
 
 

Noise music